Hu Zi'ang (March, 1897 – November 19, 1991) was a Chinese male politician, who served as the vice chairperson of the Chinese People's Political Consultative Conference.

References 

1897 births
1991 deaths
Vice Chairpersons of the National Committee of the Chinese People's Political Consultative Conference